The name Siemion may refer to:

As a surname:
Andrew Siemion (born 1980), American astrophysicist
Łukasz Siemion (born 1985), Polish rower
Wojciech Siemion (1928–2010), Polish stage and film actor

As a given name:
Semyon Budyonny (1883–1973), also spelled Siemion Budionnyi, Soviet cavalryman, military commander, and politician
Siemion Fajtlowicz (fl. 1967), Polish mathematician

See also
Simeon